The Slovenia national football team represents Slovenia in association football and is controlled by the Football Association of Slovenia, the governing body for football in Slovenia. It competes as a member of the Union of European Football Associations (UEFA), which encompasses the countries of Europe. Slovenia joined UEFA and the International Federation of Association Football (FIFA) in 1992, a year after the country gained independence from the Socialist Federal Republic of Yugoslavia.

Slovenia's first official match—a 1–1 draw against Estonia—took place on 3 June 1992. Their first victory came in their third match, a 2–0 home win against the same opponents. They entered their first major international competition in 1994: the qualifying rounds for the 1996 UEFA European Football Championship. The team won their first competitive match on 29 March 1995 when they defeated Estonia 3–0 in the 1996 European Championship qualifiers. Slovenia made its first appearance in the qualifying rounds of the FIFA World Cup during the 1998 edition.

The team's largest victory came on 8 February 1999 when they defeated Oman by seven goals to nil in the Oman International Tournament. Their worst loss is a 5–0 against France in 2002. Boštjan Cesar holds the appearance record for Slovenia, having been capped 101 times between 2003 and 2018. The goalscoring record is held by Zlatko Zahovič, who scored 35 times in 80 matches. As of December 2022, Slovenia are ranked 62nd in the FIFA World Rankings. Its highest-ever ranking of 15th was achieved in October and November 2010.

Results
Key

1992

1993

1994

1995

1996

1997

1998

1999

2000

2001

2002

2003

2004

2005

2006

2007

2008

2009

2010

2011

2012

2013

2014

2015

2016

2017

2018

2019

2020s

References
General
 
 
 

Specific

Slovenia national football team results